The 2018 NASCAR Pinty's Series was the twelfth season of the Pinty's Series, the national stock car racing series in Canada sanctioned by NASCAR. It began with the Clarington 200 at Canadian Tire Motorsport Park on 20 May and concluded with the Pinty's Fall Brawl at Jukasa Motor Speedway on 29 September. Alex Labbé entered the season as the defending Drivers' champion. Louis-Philippe Dumoulin won the championship, seven points in front of Alex Tagliani.

Drivers

Notes

Schedule
On 27 November 2017, NASCAR announced the 2018 schedule. Delaware and ICAR were dropped from the schedule in favor of a second race at Jukasa and a race at New Hampshire, which marked the first race in series history outside Canada.

Notes

Results and standings

Races

Notes
1 – Starting grid was set by the fastest lap times from the first Port of Velocity Prairie Thunder Twin 125 race.
2 – The qualifying session for the Bumper to Bumper 300 was cancelled due to weather. The starting line-up was decided by Owners' championship.

Drivers' championship

(key) Bold – Pole position awarded by time. Italics – Pole position set by final practice results or Owners' points. * – Most laps led.

Notes
1 – Andrew Ranger was assessed a time penalty for over-aggressive driving on the white-flag lap, dropping him to the end of the lead lap.
2 – Kevin Lacroix was parked for over-aggressive driving three laps before the finish.

See also

2018 Monster Energy NASCAR Cup Series
2018 NASCAR Xfinity Series
2018 NASCAR Camping World Truck Series
2018 NASCAR K&N Pro Series East
2018 NASCAR K&N Pro Series West
2018 NASCAR Whelen Modified Tour
2018 NASCAR PEAK Mexico Series
2018 NASCAR Whelen Euro Series

References

External links

Pinty's Series Standings and Statistics for 2018

NASCAR Pinty's Series

NASCAR Pinty's Series